Cassie Wild (born 12 June 2000) is a British swimmer. She competed in the women's 50 metre backstroke event at the 2020 European Aquatics Championships, in Budapest, Hungary.

Wild is from Chester and she is a student at the University of Stirling. Wild was named as a member of the British team to go to the postponed 2020 Olympics in April 2021. This would be her first Olympics where she would join an "exceptionally high quality team" including more experienced British Olympians including Aimee Willmott and Molly Renshaw.

References

External links
 
 

2000 births
Living people
English female swimmers
British female backstroke swimmers
Place of birth missing (living people)
Swimmers at the 2018 Commonwealth Games
Commonwealth Games competitors for Scotland
European Aquatics Championships medalists in swimming
Swimmers at the 2020 Summer Olympics
Olympic swimmers of Great Britain
21st-century British women
Scottish female swimmers
Sportspeople from Chester
Sportspeople from Edinburgh